Dennis Ward is the name of:

 Dennis Ward (musician) (born 1969), American bassist, guitarist, vocalist and record producer
 Dennis Ward (rugby league), Australian rugby league footballer

See also
 Denis Ward, rugby league footballer of the 1960s and 1970s for Castleford